Inositol, or more precisely myo-inositol, is a carbocyclic sugar that is abundant in the brain and other mammalian tissues; it mediates cell signal transduction in response to a variety of hormones, neurotransmitters, and growth factors and participates in osmoregulation. 

It is a sugar alcohol with half the sweetness of sucrose (table sugar). It is made naturally in the human body from glucose. A human kidney makes about two grams per day. Other tissues synthesize it too, and the highest concentration is in the brain, where it plays an important role by making other neurotransmitters and some steroid hormones bind to their receptors. Inositol is promoted as a dietary supplement in the management of polycystic ovary syndrome (PCOS). However, there is only evidence of very low quality for its efficacy in increasing fertility for IVF in women with PCOS.

Overview

myo-Inositol plays an important role as the structural basis for a number of secondary messengers in eukaryotic cells, the various inositol phosphates. In addition, inositol serves as an important component of the structural lipids phosphatidylinositol (PI) and its various phosphates, the phosphatidylinositol phosphate (PIP) lipids.

Inositol or its phosphates and associated lipids are found in many foods, in particular fruit, especially cantaloupe and oranges. In plants, the hexaphosphate of inositol, phytic acid or its salts, the phytates, serve as phosphate stores in seed, for example in nuts and beans. Phytic acid also occurs in cereals with high bran content. Phytate is, however, not directly bioavailable to humans in the diet, since it is not digestible. Some food preparation techniques partly break down phytates to change this. However, inositol in the form of glycerophospholipids, as found in certain plant-derived substances such as lecithins, is well absorbed and relatively bioavailable.

myo-Inositol (free of phosphate) was once considered a member of the vitamin B complex, called Vitamin B8 in this context. However, because it is produced by the human body from glucose, it is not an essential nutrient.

Isomers and structure 
myo-Inositol is the biologically important form of cyclohexane-1,2,3,4,5,6-hexol.  It is a meso compound, i.e. optically inactive because it has a plane of symmetry. It was formerly called meso-inositol, but because there are other meso isomers, myo-inositol is now the preferred name.  Besides myo-inositol, the other naturally occurring stereoisomers are scyllo-, muco-, -chiro-, -chiro-,and neo-inositol, although they occur in minimal quantities in nature. The other possible isomers are  allo-, epi-, and cis-inositol. As their names denote,  - and  -chiro inositol are the only pair of enantiomers (mirror-image forms).  All the others are meso compounds. 
{|
|-
| 
| 
| 
| 
|- align=center
| myo-
| scyllo-
| muco-
| chiro-
|-
| 
| 
| 
| 
|- align=center
| neo-
| allo-
| epi-
| cis-
|}

In its most stable conformation, the myo-inositol isomer assumes the chair conformation, which moves the maximum number of hydroxyls to the equatorial position, where they are farthest apart from each other. In this conformation, the natural myo isomer has a structure in which five of the six hydroxyls (the first, third, fourth, fifth, and sixth) are equatorial, whereas the second hydroxyl group is axial.

Biosynthesis 
myo-Inositol is synthesized from glucose 6-phosphate (G6P) in two steps. First, G6P is isomerised by an inositol-3-phosphate synthase enzyme (for example, ISYNA1) to myo-inositol 1-phosphate, which is then dephosphorylated by an inositol monophosphatase enzyme (for example, IMPA1)  to give free myo-inositol. In humans, most inositol is synthesized in the kidneys, followed by testicles, typically in amounts of a few grams per day. at the peripheral level, myo-inositol is converted  to -chiro-inositol by a specific epimerase. The activity of this epimerase is insulin dependent. Worthy of note, only a small quantity of myo-inositol is converted into -chiro-inositol and the conversion is irreversible.

Inositol, phosphatidylinositol and some of their mono- and polyphosphates function as secondary messengers in a number of intracellular signal transduction pathways. They are involved in a number of biological processes, including:
 Insulin signal transduction
 Cytoskeleton assembly
 Nerve guidance (epsin)
 Intracellular calcium (Ca2+) concentration control
 Cell membrane potential maintenance
 Breakdown of fats
 Gene expression
In one important family of pathways, phosphatidylinositol 4,5-bisphosphate (PIP2) is stored in cellular membranes until it is released by any of a number of signalling proteins and transformed into various secondary messengers, for example diacylglycerol and inositol triphosphate.

Phytic acid in plants 

Inositol hexaphosphate, also called phytic acid or IP6, is the principal storage form of phosphorus in many plant tissues, especially bran and seed. Phosphorus and inositol in phytate form are not generally bioavailable to non-ruminant animals because these animals lack the digestive enzyme phytase required to remove the phosphate groups. Ruminants are readily able to digest phytate because of the phytase produced by microorganisms in the rumen. Moreover, phytic acid also chelates important minerals such as calcium, magnesium, iron, and zinc, making them unabsorbable, and contributing to mineral deficiencies in people whose diets rely highly on bran and seeds for their mineral intake, such as occurs in developing countries.

Inositol penta- (IP5), tetra- (IP4), and triphosphate (IP3) are also called "phytates".

Industrial uses

Explosives industry 
At the 1936 meeting of the American Chemical Society, professor Edward Bartow of the University of Iowa presented a commercially viable means of extracting large amounts of inositol from the phytic acid naturally present in waste corn. As a possible use for the chemical, he suggested 'inositol nitrate' as a more stable alternative to nitroglycerin. Today, inositol nitrate is used to gelatinize nitrocellulose in many modern explosives and solid rocket propellants.

Road salt 
When plants are exposed to increasing concentrations of road salt, the plant cells become dysfunctional and undergo apoptosis, leading to inhibited growth. Inositol pretreatment could reverse these effects.

Research and clinical applications

Psychiatry

Depression 
Large doses of inositol have been studied for treatment of depression, but further study is needed to determine whether this is an effective treatment.

Panic disorder and obsessive-compulsive disorder 
Inositol has been found to have modest to moderate effects in patients with panic disorder or obsessive-compulsive disorder.

Trichotillomania 
High doses of inositol are sometimes used to treat trichotillomania (compulsive hair-pulling) and related disorders, but a small (N=38) double-blinded placebo-controlled trial did not find a statistically significant improvement with inositol.

Other illnesses 
Inositol should not be routinely implemented for the management of preterm babies who have or are at a risk of infant respiratory distress syndrome (RDS). Myo-inositol helps prevent neural tube defects with particular efficacy in combination with folic acid.

Inositol is considered a safe and effective treatment for polycystic ovary syndrome (PCOS). It works by increasing insulin sensitivity, which helps to improve ovarian function and reduce hyperandrogenism. It is also shown to reduce the risk of metabolic disease in people with PCOS. In addition, thanks to its role as FSH second messenger, myo-inositol is effective in restoring FSH/LH ratio and menstrual cycle regularization. myo-Inositol's role as FSH second messenger leads to a correct ovarian follicle maturation and consequently to a higher oocyte quality. Improving the oocyte quality in both women with or without PCOS, myo-inositol can be considered as a possible approach for increasing the chance of success in assisted reproductive technologies. In contrast, -chiro-inositol can impair oocyte quality in a dose-dependent manner. The high level of DCI seems to be related to elevated insulin levels retrieved in about 70% of PCOS women.  In this regard, insulin stimulates the irreversible conversion of myo-inositol to -chiro-inositol causing a drastic reduction of myo-inositol. myo-Inositol depletion is particularly damaging to ovarian follicles because it is involved in FSH signaling, which is impaired due to myo-inositol depletion. Recent evidence reports a faster improvement of the metabolic and hormonal parameters when these two isomers are administered in their physiological ratio. The plasmatic ratio of myo-inositol and -chiro-inositol in healthy subjects is 40:1 of myo- and -chiro-inositol respectively. The use of the 40:1 ratio shows the same efficacy of myo-inositol alone but in a shorter time. In addition, the physiological ratio does not impair oocyte quality.

The use of inositols in PCOS is gaining more importance, and an efficacy higher than 70% with a strong safety profile is reported. On the other hand, about 30% of patients could show as inositol-resistant. New evidence regarding PCOS aetiopathogenesis describes an alteration in the species and the quantity of each strain characterizing the normal gastrointestinal flora. This alteration could lead to chronic, low-level inflammation and malabsorption. A possible solution could be represented by the combination of myo-inositol and α-lactalbumin. This combination shows a synergic effect in increasing myo-inositol absorption. A recent study reported that the myo-inositol and α-lactalbumin combination is able to increase myo-inositol plasmatic content in inositol-resistant patients with a relative improvement of hormonal and metabolic parameters. 

Despite its antinutrient effect, phytic acid has potential uses in endodontics, adhesive, preventive, and regenerative dentistry, and in improving the characteristics and performance of dental materials.

Use as a cutting agent 
Inositol has been used as an adulterant or cutting agent for many illegal drugs, such as cocaine, methamphetamine, and sometimes heroin,  probably because of its solubility, powdery texture, or reduced sweetness (50%) compared to more common sugars.

Inositol is also used as a stand-in film prop for cocaine in filmmaking.

Nutritional sources 
myo-Inositol is naturally present in a variety of foods, although tables of food composition do not always distinguish between lecithin, the relatively bioavailable lipid form and the biounavailable phytate/phosphate form. Foods containing the highest concentrations of myo-inositol and its compounds include fruits, beans, grains, and nuts. Fruits in particular, especially oranges and cantaloupe, contain the highest amounts of myo-inositol. It is also present in beans, nuts, and grains, however, these contain large amounts of myo-inositol in the phytate form, which is not bioavailable without transformation by phytase enzymes. Bacillus subtilis, the microorganism which produces the fermented food natto, produces phytase enzymes that may convert phytic acid to a more bioavailable form of inositol polyphosphate in the gut. Additionally, Bacteroides species in the gut secrete vesicles containing an active enzyme which converts the phytate molecule into bioavailable phosphorus and inositol polyphosphate, which is an important signaling molecule in the human body. 

myo-Inositol can also be found as an ingredient in energy drinks, either in conjunction with or as a substitute for glucose, ostensibly to increase serotonin levels and alertness.

In humans, myo-inositol is naturally made from glucose-6-phosphate through enzymatic dephosphorylation.

References

External links 

U.S. National Library of Medicine: Drug Information Portal – Inositol
Inositol MS Spectrum
Inositol bound to proteins in the PDB

 
Biology of bipolar disorder
Biology of obsessive–compulsive disorder
Chemopreventive agents
Treatment of obsessive–compulsive disorder
Xanthine oxidase inhibitors